'The Ultimate W Expert Challenge is a three-part Canadian reality series produced by General Purpose Pictures that aired on W Network in Canada in summer 2009. Hosted by Karen Bertelsen, also the host of Playing House, the program took seven experts from all across Canada and made them compete in various challenges for the title of the Ultimate W Expert.

Show format  
Each episode revolves around one major challenge, hosted by Karen Bertlesen. The challenges included making a presentation to a boardroom full of children, hosting a divorce party for a fake couple played by actors and speaking in front of a mall crowd. Each challenge was judged by hosts of current W Shows. The guest judges included:

Hina Khan & Dylan Marcel from Save Us from Our House
Glenn Dixon & Glenn Peloso from Take This House and Sell It
Candice Olson from Divine Design and Bruce Turner from Style by Jury

Competitors  
The Experts won an online competition held by the W Network in order to be eligible to compete for the show. The first season's competitors were:

Preet Banerjee: Financial Expert
Daniela Garritano: Interior Design Expert
Dr. Cheryl Fraser: Relationship Expert
Kristine Laing - Food and Nutrition Expert
Eric Arrouze - Food Expert
Jackson West - Interior Design Expert
Mark Galati - Hair Stylist Expert

Winner  
Preet Banerjee was declared the winner of the Ultimate W Expert Challenge. He writes a daily blog with tips on how to save money.

External links  
 Official website
 W Network Micro Site Preet

Canadian reality television series
W Network original programming
2009 Canadian television series debuts
2009 Canadian television series endings
2000s Canadian reality television series